Colonial goose is a preparation of roast leg of lamb or mutton popular as a dish in New Zealand until the last quarter of the 20th century.

Early colonial pioneers in New Zealand had sheep aplenty, but goose was relatively scarce. To prepare dishes similar to those they had back home in the old country the pioneers were very inventive.  Colonial goose is now a recognised classic, with some restaurants featuring it as a main attraction at midwinter festivities (21 June in New Zealand).

It involves the careful boning out of a leg of lamb, stuffing it with honey and dried apricots, in addition to traditional stuffing based on breadcrumbs, onion, parsley and thyme or sage, and then marinating it in a red wine-based marinade which gives it the appearance of goose when cooked.

The 1919 cookbook First Catch Your Weka: A Story of New Zealand Food by David Veart, contains a recipe for colonial goose.

See also

 List of lamb dishes

References

External links
 Colonial goose recipe at Wikibooks Cookbook

New Zealand cuisine
Lamb dishes